The Pennsylvania Lumber Museum is near Galeton, Potter County, Pennsylvania in the United States. It documents the history and technology of the lumber industry that was a vital part of the economic development and ecological destruction of Pennsylvania.

The Pennsylvania Lumber Museum conducts tours of the grounds, educational workshops and classes. It also hosts the occasional Lumberjack competition.

Brief history of the lumber industry in Pennsylvania

Prior to the arrival of William Penn and his Quaker colonists to Pennsylvania in 1682, it has been estimated that up to 90% of Pennsylvania was covered with over 20 million acres (80,000 km²) of woods that consisted of a variety of white pine, Eastern hemlock, and a mix of hardwoods. Over 300 years later nearly all of the once enormous landscape of old-growth forest is gone. The forest near the early settlements in Philadelphia, Bucks, Delaware and Montgomery Counties were the first to be harvested as the early settlers used the readily available timber to build homes, barns and ships and to clear land for farming purposes. The demand for lumber slowly increased and by the time of the American Revolution the lumber industry had reached the interior and mountainous regions of Pennsylvania. Incredibly tall and straight trunks of white pine and hemlock were lashed together on rafts and floated down the Susquehanna and Delaware Rivers to Baltimore and Philadelphia for use as masts on all sorts of sailing ships. Some of the early pioneers saw business opportunities in the forests surrounding their new homes and they opened water powered sawmills along the banks of creeks like the Loyalsock, Lycoming and Larrys Creek. Lumber soon became one of the leading industries in Pennsylvania. In addition to constructing homes and ships the trees of Pennsylvania were used to furnish fuel to heat homes, tannin for the many tanneries that were spread throughout Pennsylvania, wood for furniture and barrel making, large areas of trees were harvested by colliers to fire the iron furnaces of Cornwall, Greenwood and Pine Grove, rifle stocks and shingles were made as were a wide variety of household utensils, the first Conestoga wagons were built using the abundant supplies of lumber that were growing on the hillsides and in the valleys of Pennsylvania.

Rise

The Pennsylvania lumber industry became a massive enterprise beginning in the middle part of the 19th century. Experienced lumbermen from New England like John Leighton and James Perkins arrived at Williamsport along the West Branch Susquehanna River in 1846. The oversaw the construction of the Susquehanna Boom. A boom is a chain or line of connected floating timbers extended across a river, lake, or harbor (to obstruct passage or catch floating objects). The Susquehanna Boom was in operation for over 50 years and it processed over 5.5 billion board feet (13 million m³) of lumber from 1861 to 1891, which led to Williamsport, Pennsylvania having more millionaires per capita than any other city at the time. The introduction of the steam train to the mountains of Pennsylvania brought about another change in Pennsylvania's lumber industry. The white pine forests had been largely harvested by this time and the lumbermen now sought to gather the vast stands of hemlock. Railroad companies like the Jersey Shore, Pine Creek and Buffalo Railway opened and built tracks into parts of the mountains that had been previously impossible or too difficult to access. The railroads were able to remove more trees faster than the old system floating logs downs creeks and rivers. As a result the decline of the old growth forest was increased. In addition to rapidly removing the timber sparks and embers tossed out by the passing steam engines would land on the side of the railroads. These sparks set off massive forest fires that devastated the saplings that had risen up to take the place of the old growth forests. The beginning of the end of the lumber industry in Pennsylvania had arrived with the steam trains and other steam powered equipment, but this was not before the rise of many lumber "boom towns" that once peppered the Pennsylvania mountains.

The Beaver Mill Lumber Company in Centre County became one of the largest single lumber operations in all of Pennsylvania. Beaver Mills and Antes, two lumber boom towns, dramatically changed the landscape in the Black Moshannon Area in Centre County. Beaver ponds were wiped out by a mill ponds, built to serve the needs of Beaver Mills and Antes. Both communities featured a large general store, blacksmith shops, a livery, taverns, schools and even a ten-pin bowling alley. The school is still standing today. The area helped to meet the nation's need for timber in mining operations, construction and railroads.

Fall
This boom era was not to last, and by the 1920s all the trees were gone. Once the trees disappeared, the people were soon to follow. They moved to West Virginia and the Great Lake States. The lumbermen left behind a barren landscape that was devastated by erosion and wildfires. The Commonwealth of Pennsylvania bought the thousands of acres of deforested and burned land from the lumber companies. The state began the massive project of reforesting the land with the help of the Civilian Conservation Corps. The old growth forests of hemlock and white pine have been replaced by a thriving second growth forest of hardwoods.

References

External links

Pennsylvania Lumber Museum official site
PA Dept. of Conservation and Natural Resources information about the museum

Museums in Potter County, Pennsylvania
Forestry museums in the United States
Industry museums in Pennsylvania
Rural history museums in Pennsylvania